Sedati is a district in the Sidoarjo Regency in Java, Indonesia. Juanda International Airport is located in this district.

Districts of East Java
Sidoarjo Regency